Charles Joseph Vogel (September 20, 1898 – September 8, 1980) was a United States circuit judge of the United States Court of Appeals for the Eighth Circuit and previously was a United States district judge of the United States District Court for the District of North Dakota.

Education and career

Born in Star Lake Township, Minnesota, Vogel was in the United States Army as a Sergeant from 1918 to 1919, and then received a Bachelor of Laws from the University of Minnesota Law School in 1923. He was in private practice in Minot, North Dakota from 1924 to 1925, and in Fargo, North Dakota from 1925 to 1941. He was a Referee in Bankruptcy for the United States District Court for the District of North Dakota in 1924, and was an unsuccessful Democratic candidate for United States Senate from North Dakota in 1940.

Federal judicial service

Vogel was nominated by President Franklin D. Roosevelt on July 15, 1941, to a seat on the United States District Court for the District of North Dakota vacated by Judge Andrew Miller. He was confirmed by the United States Senate on October 27, 1941, and received his commission on October 30, 1941. He served as Chief Judge in 1954. His service was terminated on August 20, 1954, due to his elevation to the Eighth Circuit. As of 2020, Vogel is the last judge for the District of North Dakota to have been appointed by a Democratic president.

Vogel was nominated by President Dwight D. Eisenhower on August 16, 1954, to a seat on the United States Court of Appeals for the Eighth Circuit vacated by Judge Walter Garrett Riddick. He was confirmed by the Senate on August 18, 1954, and received his commission on August 20, 1954. He served as Chief Judge from 1965 to 1968 and as a member of the Judicial Conference of the United States from 1965 to 1967. He assumed senior status on February 20, 1968. His service was terminated on September 8, 1980, due to his death.

References

Sources
 

1898 births
1980 deaths
People from Otter Tail County, Minnesota
Judges of the United States District Court for the District of North Dakota
United States district court judges appointed by Franklin D. Roosevelt
20th-century American judges
Judges of the United States Court of Appeals for the Eighth Circuit
United States court of appeals judges appointed by Dwight D. Eisenhower
University of Minnesota Law School alumni
North Dakota lawyers
United States Army soldiers